Pheia taperinhae is a moth in the subfamily Arctiinae. It was described by Paul Dognin in 1923. It is found in Brazil.

References

Natural History Museum Lepidoptera generic names catalog

Moths described in 1923
taperinhae